Khan Amir may refer to:
Khan Amir, Lorestan
Khan Amir, East Azerbaijan
Khan Amir, West Azerbaijan